Shdema is a moshav in south-central Israel. Located near Gedera in the coastal plain, it falls under the jurisdiction of Gederot Regional Council.

History
The moshav was founded in 1954 to absorb immigrants to Israel from Iran, on the lands of the depopulated Palestinian village of Bashshit. After the group refused to live there, it was populated by urban residents who chose to live an agricultural cooperative lifestyle and arrived as part of the movement "from city to village."

The word "Shdema", which appears infrequently in the Hebrew Bible, means "field of produce". The original name was "Yefe Nof".

Notable residents
Avihu Ben-Nun

References

Iranian-Jewish culture in Israel
Moshavim
Populated places in Central District (Israel)
Populated places established in 1954
1954 establishments in Israel
Agricultural Union